Cretonia is a genus of moths of the family Noctuidae. The genus was erected by Francis Walker in 1866.

Species
Cretonia acuticosta Holloway, 2009 India, Taiwan, Sumatra, Borneo, Java, Bali, Halmahera
Cretonia brevioripalpus Hulstaert, 1924 Tenimber, Timor, Dammer, New Guinea, Solomons
Cretonia ethiopica Hampson, 1910 Gambia, Zimbabwe, Mozambique, Kenya, Ethiopia
Cretonia floccifera (Hampson, 1896) Bhutan
Cretonia forficula Holloway, 2009 Peninsular Malaysia, Hainan, Borneo, Bali, Sulawesi
Cretonia lanka (Holloway, 2009) Sri Lanka
Cretonia platyphaeella Walker, 1866 Gambia, Sierra Leone, Nigeria
Cretonia triloba Holloway, 2009 Philippines
Cretonia vegetus (Swinhoe, 1885) India (Maharashtra), Myanmar, South Africa

References

Acontiinae